American literary regionalism or local color is a style or genre of writing in the United States that gained popularity in the mid to late 19th century into the early 20th century. In this style of writing, which includes both poetry and prose, the setting is particularly important and writers often emphasize specific features such as dialect, customs, history, and landscape, of a particular region: "Such a locale is likely to be rural and/or provincial." Regionalism is influenced by both 19th-century realism and romanticism, adhering to a fidelity of description in the narrative but also infusing the tale with exotic or unfamiliar customs, objects, and people.

Literary critics argue that nineteenth-century literary regionalism helped preserve American regional identities while also contributing to domestic reunification efforts after the Civil War. Richard Brodhead argues in Cultures of Letters, "Regionalism's representation of vernacular cultures as enclaves of tradition insulated from larger cultural contact is palpably a fiction ... its public function was not just to mourn lost cultures but to purvey a certain story of contemporary cultures and of the relations among them" (121). Amy Kaplan, in contrast, debates race relations, empire, and literary regionalism in the nineteenth century, noting that, "The regions painted with 'local color' are traversed by the forgotten history of racial conflict with prior regional inhabitants, and are ultimately produced and engulfed by the centralized capitalist economy that generates the desire for retreat" (256). Critic Eric Sundquist ultimately suggests the social inequity inherent in the aesthetic distinction between realist and regionalist authors: "Economic or political power can itself be seen to be definitive of a realist aesthetic, in that those in power (say, white urban males) have been more often judged 'realists,' while those removed from the seats of power (say, Midwesterners, blacks, immigrants, or women) have been categorized as regionalists" (503).

Regional writers

References

Bibliography
 "New England in the Short Story." Atlantic Monthly 67 (1891): 845–850.
 Wood, Ann D. "The Literature of Impoverishment: The Women Local Colorists in America, 1865–1914." Women's Studies: An Interdisciplinary Journal 1 (1972): 3–46.
 Donovan, Josephine (1983) New England Local Color Literature: A Women's Tradition. New York: Ungar.
 
 
 
 
 Nickels, Cameron C. New England Humor: From the Revolutionary War to the Civil War. 1st ed. Knoxville: University of Tennessee Press, 1993.
  (Discusses magazines such as Atlantic Monthly, The Century, Harper's Monthly,  The Nation, Scribners)
 Pryse, Marjorie. "Origins of American Literary Regionalism: Gender in Irving, Stowe, and Longstreet." In Breaking Boundaries: New Perspectives on Women's Regional Writing, edited by Sherrie A. Inness and Diana Royer, pp. 17–37. Iowa City: University of Iowa Press, 1997
 
 
 
 
 Lutz, Tom. Cosmopolitan Vistas: American Regionalism and Literary Value. Ithaca, N.Y.: Cornell University Press, 2004. via Google Books
 
 

History of literature in the United States
American literary movements